Bouckaert is a surname. Notable people with the surname include:

 Boudewijn Bouckaert (born 1947), a Belgian law professor, a member of the Flemish Movement and a conservative politician
 Carl Bouckaert (born 1954), a Belgian equestrian and businessman
 Daniel Bouckaert (1894–1965), a Belgian vaulter who competed in the 1920 Summer Olympics
 Harm Bouckaert (born 1934), an art dealer, gallerist, and major figure in the 1980s art scene in New York
 Henri Bouckaert (1870–1912), a French competition rower and Olympic champion
 Jente Bouckaert (born 1990), a Belgian athlete who competes in the sprint
 Peter Bouckaert (born 1970), Belgian human rights activist